Gods and Monsters is an American psychedelic rock band from New York City, known for once having singer-songwriter Jeff Buckley as a member in the early 1990s.

Gods and Monsters was founded by ex-Captain Beefheart guitarist, Gary Lucas, and was named after a quotation from the 1935 horror film Bride of Frankenstein: "To a new world of gods and monsters!". Gods and Monsters has performed at Manhattan music venues such as the Knitting Factory and CBGB.  Other members of the loosely-knit band have included Jerry Harrison, Billy Ficca, Richard Barone, and Modern Lovers member Ernie Brooks.  Emily Duff (Her last name then was her maiden name) replaced Jeff Buckley as lead singer after he left to start his solo career.

References
 Browne, David. Dream Brother: The Lives and Music of Jeff and Tim Buckley. HarperEntertainment. 2001, 2002.  
Desalvo, Deb (June 22, 1998). "Everybody Wants You: Jeff Buckley". Rolling Stone. Retrieved on April 23, 2007.
 

Musical groups from New York City
Progressive rock musical groups from New York (state)